Aziz Fatimah Medical and Dental College Faisalabad or AFMDC, is a private medical college in Faisalabad,
Punjab, Pakistan. It is located on West Canal Road in the old Ghafoor Bashir Children Hospital Building at the opposite side of Chiniot Islamia School. It is a project of Sitara Group of Industries and is affiliated with University of Health Sciences, Lahore.

Aziz Fatimah Medical and Dental College is attached to Aziz Fatimah Hospital Faisalabad. It is recognized by the Pakistan Medical and Dental Council with an annual admissions quota of 100 MBBS students. 

The college opened in January 2012; it was one of 19 new medical colleges registered by the Pakistan Medical and Dental Council and the Ministry of National Regulation and Services in December 2012.

References

External links 
 Official website

Medical colleges in Punjab, Pakistan
Universities and colleges in Faisalabad District
Faisalabad